Day and Night is a 2017 Chinese streaming television series directed by Wang Wei and written by Zhiwen. It stars Pan Yueming, Wang Longzheng, Liang Yuan, Lü Xiaolin, and Yin Shuyi. The series tells the story of Guan Hongfeng, the former captain of the Changfeng Criminal Investigation Detachment, who solves many cases to get his brother Guan Hongyu exonerated. It premiered in China via Youku starting August 30, 2017.

Plot
Guan Hongfeng, a former police captain suffering from nyctophobia, returns to solving mysteries alongside the hot-tempered Captain Zhou Xun and rookie officer Zhou Shutong. However, he has a hidden agenda, which is to clear his identical twin brother Guan Hongyu's name from the alleged murder of an entire family.

Cast

Main
 Pan Yueming as Guan Hongfeng, former captain of the Changfeng Criminal Investigation Detachment.
 Pan Yueming as Guan Hongyu, Guan Hongfeng's twin brother.
 Wang Longzheng as Zhou Xun, captain of the Changfeng Criminal Investigation Detachment.
 Liang Yuan as Zhou Shutong, Liu Changyong's daughter, after graduating from a Police Academy, she becomes a member of the Changfeng Criminal Investigation Detachment. 
 Lü Xiaolin as Gao Yanan, legal medical expert in the Changfeng Criminal Investigation Detachment.
 Yin Shuyi as Zhao Qian, Zhou Shutong's schoolmate, a policewoman.

Supporting
 Yang Kaidi as Liu Yin, hostess of the Yinsu Bar. 
 Wu Wenjing as Zhao Xincheng, vice-captain of the Seaport Detachment.
 Liu Boxi as Han Bin, an adviser in the Seaport Detachment.
 Hou Xuelong as Xiao Wang, a criminal police in the Changfeng Criminal Investigation Detachment.
 Song Naigang as Liu Changyong, Zhou Shutong's father, vice-captain of the Changfeng Criminal Investigation Detachment.
 Yue Xiaoyou as Ye Fangzhou, Zhou Shutong's former boyfriend, he used to be a criminal police officer, he has been dismissed for breach of discipline.
 Sun Jiaolong as Jin Shan, a terrorist who sells arms.
 Wang Zheng as Wang Zhige, a homicidal maniac. He is executed by shooting.
 Cao Ge as Uncle Geng.
 Sun Letian as Ji Jie.
 Sun Meiqi as Xin Yi.
 Xiao Mi as Piao Sen.
 Gao Zigang as Liu Yan.
 Ning Xiaohua as Li Chuan.
 Gao Guo as Dong Qian.
 Huang Wei as Yaoji, a drug trafficker.
 Lu Hao as Guo Peng, a fuerdai and playboy.
 Ma Wei as Ren Di, a bar singer.

Production

Development
Scriptwriter Zhiwen started on the script in 2014 and worked on it for three years. Day and Night took inspiration from Insomnia, a 2002 American psychological thriller film directed by Christopher Nolan. The show's premise also bears resemblance to Nolan's 2006 film The Prestige.

Filming
Filming took place in Beijing, Dongguan, Changchun and lasted 120 days.

Soundtrack

Reception
The television series received positive reviews for its complicated and tight storyline. It received 24.6 billion hits since it broadcast on Youku and scored 9.0/10 score on Douban.

Awards and nominations

Broadcast
On June 16, 2017, the producers attended the 23rd Shanghai TV Festival and released a three minute trailer. On July 11, the producers released the first official poster.

Day and Night was released on August 30, 2017 in China.

International broadcast
On November 30, 2017, Netflix has acquired global rights outside mainland China to the series. The TV series will be broadcast in more than 190 countries and regions.

References

External links
 
 
 

2017 Chinese television series debuts
Chinese crime television series
Chinese web series
Youku original programming
2017 web series debuts
Crime drama web series